Nasrat Haqparast (born August 22, 1995) is a German mixed martial artist (MMA) who currently competes in the Lightweight division in the UFC.

Background 
Haqparast was born in Germany to Afghan parents from Kandahar who came as refugees from Afghanistan.  He attended kickboxing classes as his parents believed he was overweight at fourteen years old. Subsequently, Haqparast joined an MMA class and decided to be an MMA fighter after witnessing a sparring session in the room next to the kickboxing class.

Mixed martial arts career

Early career 
Haqparast started his professional MMA career in 2012 and amassed a record of 8-1 before being signed by UFC.

Ultimate Fighting Championship 
Haqparast made his UFC debut on October 21, 2017 against Marcin Held, replacing injured Teemu Packalén at UFC Fight Night: Cowboy vs. Till. He lost the fight via unanimous decision.

Haqparast was scheduled to face  Alex Reyes on March 17, 2018 at UFC Fight Night: Werdum vs. Volkov. However, on March 8, it was reported that Alex Reyes pulled out of the fight due to injury and he was replaced by Nad Narimani. The bout was scrapped on the day of the event as Haqparast was deemed unfit to fight by the medical team due to an infectious eye condition.

His next fight came on July 22, 2018 at UFC Fight Night 134 against Marc Diakiese. He won the fight via unanimous decision.

Haqparast faced Thibault Gouti on October 27, 2018 at UFC Fight Night 138. He won the fight via unanimous decision.   This fight earned him the Fight of the Night award.

Haqparast was expected to face John Makdessi on March 23, 2019 at UFC Fight Night 148. However, on March 13, 2019, it was reported that Haqparast was pulled from the bout due to injury.

Haqparast faced on August 3, 2019 Joaquim Silva on UFC on ESPN 5. He won the fight via knockout in the second round. The win earned him the Performance of the Night bonus award.

Haqparast faced Drew Dober on January 18, 2020 at UFC 246. He lost the fight via knockout in the first round.

Haqparast faced Alexander Muñoz on August 8, 2020 at UFC Fight Night 174. He won the fight via unanimous decision.

Haqparast was scheduled to face Arman Tsarukyan on January 24, 2021 at UFC 257. However, on the day of the weigh-ins, Haqparast pulled out of the fight citing illness.

Haqparast was scheduled to face Don Madge, replacing injured Guram Kutateladze, on March 13, 2021 at UFC Fight Night 187. However, Madge withdrew from the bout due to visa issues and was replaced by UFC newcomer Rafa García. Haqparast won the fight via unanimous decision.

Haqparast faced Dan Hooker on September 25, 2021 at UFC 266. He lost the fight via unanimous decision.

Haqparast faced Bobby Green on February 12, 2022 at UFC 271. He lost the bout via unanimous decision.

Haqparast faced John Makdessi on September 3, 2022 at UFC Fight Night 209. He won the fight via unanimous decision.

Haqparast was scheduled to face Jamie Mullarkey February 12, 2023, at UFC 284.  However, Haqparast withdrew due to undisclosed reason and was replaced by promotional newcomer Francisco Prado.

Championships and accomplishments
Ultimate Fighting Championship
Fight of the Night (One time) 
Performance of the Night (One time)

Personal life 
Haqparast was a mechanical engineering student at Hamburg University of Applied Sciences.

When Haqparast made his UFC debut he was dubbed by several media members as a "mini" version of middleweight fighter Kelvin Gastelum due to their close physical resemblance. This has resulted in many media outlets comparing their fighting styles often.

Haqparast's mother passed away in September 2021, which was weeks prior to his fight at UFC 266.

Mixed martial arts record 

|Win
|align=center|14–5
|John Makdessi
|Decision (unanimous)
|UFC Fight Night: Gane vs. Tuivasa
|
|align=center|3
|align=center|5:00
|Paris, France
|-->
|-
|Loss
|align=center|13–5
|Bobby Green
|Decision (unanimous)
|UFC 271
|
|align=center|3
|align=center|5:00
|Houston, Texas, United States
|
|-
|Loss
|align=center|13–4
|Dan Hooker
|Decision (unanimous)
|UFC 266 
|
|align=center|3
|align=center|5:00
|Las Vegas, Nevada, United States
|
|-
|Win
|align=center|13–3
|Rafa García
|Decision (unanimous)
|UFC Fight Night: Edwards vs. Muhammad
|
|align=center|3
|align=center|5:00
|Las Vegas, Nevada, United States
|
|-
|Win
|align=center|12–3
|Alexander Muñoz
|Decision (unanimous)
|UFC Fight Night: Lewis vs. Oleinik 
|
|align=center|3
|align=center|5:00
|Las Vegas, Nevada, United States
|
|-
|Loss
|align=center|11–3
|Drew Dober
| KO (punches)
|UFC 246 
|
|align=center|1
|align=center|1:10
|Las Vegas, Nevada, United States
| 
|-
|Win
|align=center| 11–2
|Joaquim Silva
|KO (punches)
|UFC on ESPN: Covington vs. Lawler
|
|align=center|2
|align=center|0:36
|Newark, New Jersey, United States
|
|-
|Win
|align=center| 10–2
|Thibault Gouti
|Decision (unanimous)
|UFC Fight Night: Volkan vs. Smith
|
|align=center| 3
|align=center| 5:00
|Moncton, New Brunswick, Canada
|
|-
|Win
|align=center| 9–2
|Marc Diakiese
|Decision (unanimous)
|UFC Fight Night: Shogun vs. Smith
|
|align=center| 3
|align=center| 5:00
|Hamburg, Germany
|
|-
|Loss
|align=center| 8–2
|Marcin Held
|Decision (unanimous)
|UFC Fight Night: Cowboy vs. Till
|
|align=center| 3
|align=center| 5:00
|Gdańsk, Poland
|
|-
|Win
|align=center| 8–1
|Ruslan Kalyniuk
|TKO (punches)
|Superior FC 17
|
|align=center| 3
|align=center| 1:44
|Dueren, Germany
|
|-
|Win
|align=center| 7–1
|Patrik Berisha
|TKO (punches)
|We Love MMA 24
|
|align=center| 2
|align=center| 0:18
|Hamburg, Germany
|
|-
|Win
|align=center| 6–1
|Lampros Pistikos
|TKO (punches)
|Ravage Series 2
|
|align=center| 1
|align=center| 3:36
|Hamburg, Germany
|
|-
|Win
|align=center| 5–1
|Fabrice Kindombe
|KO (punch)
|We Love MMA 16
|
|align=center| 1
|align=center| 0:53
|Hamburg, Germany
|
|-
|Win
|align=center| 4–1
|Patrick Schwellnus
|TKO (punches)
|We Love MMA 13
|
|align=center| 1
|align=center| 2:57
|Hannover, Germany
|
|-
|Win
|align=center| 3–1
|Tolga Ozgun
|TKO (punches)
|We Love MMA 9
|
|align=center| 1
|align=center| 2:20
|Hamburg, Germany
|
|-
|Win
|align=center| 2–1
|Jiri Flajsar
|TKO (punches)
|Anatolia Fighting Championship
|
|align=center| 1
|align=center| 0:38
|Hamburg, Germany
|
|-
|Win
|align=center| 1–1
|Iles Ganijev
|TKO (punches)
|SFC 13
|
|align=center| 1
|align=center| N/A
|Hamburg, Germany
|
|-
|Loss
|align=center| 0–1
|Adrian Ruf
|Submission (triangle choke)
|We Love MMA 4
|
|align=center| 1
|align=center| 3:30
|Berlin, Germany
|

See also 
 List of current UFC fighters
 List of male mixed martial artists

References

External links 
 
 

Living people
1995 births
Lightweight mixed martial artists
German male mixed martial artists
Sportspeople from Hamburg
Hamburg University of Applied Sciences alumni
German people of Afghan descent
Ultimate Fighting Championship male fighters